The FIFA Puskás Award  is an award established on 20 October 2009 by the Fédération Internationale de Football Association (FIFA), at the behest of then-president Sepp Blatter, to be awarded to the male or female judged to have scored the most aesthetically significant, or "most beautiful", goal of the calendar year.

The award is in honour of Ferenc Puskás, the striker of Real Madrid during the late 1950s to the late 1960s, and central member of the highly successful Hungarian side of the same era. Puskás is widely considered by many to be the most powerful and prolific forward Europe produced in first-division football, and was honoured by IFFHS in 1997 as the best top-tier goalscorer of the 20th century. Puskás scored 999 goals in 533 games and his 89 national team's goals in 85 outings was a world record at the time. 

"It is important to preserve the memory of those footballing greats who have left their mark on our history. Ferenc Puskás was not only a player with immense talent who won many honours, but also a remarkable man. FIFA is therefore delighted to pay tribute to him by dedicating this award to his memory," said Blatter at the inauguration of the award in Budapest.

Until 2018, the winner was decided completely based on voting by fans on FIFA's official website. However, after a controversy in the 2018 award, FIFA changed the procedure. Now, the award is decided by pundits selected by FIFA, who will choose the winner based on the top three goals voted for by the public.

The time-frame for the first award was July 2008 to July 2009. The annual award was presented for the first time during the 2009 FIFA World Player of the Year Gala on 21 December in Switzerland, with Portuguese player Cristiano Ronaldo being the first prize winner.

Award criteria
It should be an absolutely beautiful goal (subjective, but decided by voting and judgement from experts  — the spread of goals should include long-range shots, team goals, rabona, overhead kicks, individual plays, scorpion kicks, etc.).
 It should be awarded "without distinction of championship, gender or nationality".
 It should not be the result of luck, mistakes, deflection by another player or the player in an offside position.
 It should support fair play, i.e. the player should not have behaved badly in the game or have been charged with doping, for example.
  The player cannot be nominated with two different goals.

Winners and nominees
Scores and results list the player's club goal tally first.

2009

2010

2011

2012

2013

The following list includes the nominees for the 2013 award. Voting was possible through the FIFA.com website until 9 December 2013, after a second voting round was held between the top three goals from the first round. The award to the winning goal from the second round was presented on 13 January 2014.

2014

The nominees for 2014 were announced on 12 November.

2015
FIFA announced the list of 10 nominees on 12 November 2015.

2016

 

FIFA announced the list of 10 nominees on 21 November 2016.

2017

FIFA announced the list of 10 nominees on 22 September 2017.

2018
FIFA announced the list of 10 nominees on 3 September 2018.

2019

FIFA announced the list of 10 nominees on 19 August 2019.

2020 
FIFA announced the list of 11 nominees on 25 November 2020.

2021 

FIFA announced the list of 11 nominees on 29 November 2021.

2022 
FIFA announced the list of 11 nominees on 12 January 2023.

Awards won by nationality

Most nominations received

See also
FIFA Ballon d'Or
The Best FIFA Football Awards

References

External links

Puskas Award
Puskas Award
Association football goal of the year awards
Awards established in 2009